The Polito House is a house in Los Angeles designed by Raphael Soriano, FAIA, built in 1938 and completed in 1940.

Located on a street-to-street lot on Queens Road, it features a continuous band of horizontal steel casement windows, swimming pool, sunning platforms and bridge to terraced gardens. A key feature was a 10' x 20' sandblasted window that allowed light to reach the interior stairwell while providing privacy. 

According to the Triangle Modernist Houses, the International-style residence was spotlighted in the February 1946 issue of Architectural Record.

The Politio House is one of only 12 of 50 buildings remaining by Raphael Soriano, with demolition, earthquakes and wildfire all taking their toll on the rest.

The house was photographed by American architectural photographer Julius Shulman in 1940.

Notes

Raphael Soriano buildings
Houses in Los Angeles
Houses completed in 1940